Paul Masseron (born 3 April 1950 in Landerneau, Finistère, Brittany) is  a French civil servant (prefect) who became a minister of the principality of Monaco.

He is a graduate of Institut d'études politiques de Paris (IEP Paris).

Career

 1974-1976 : École nationale d’administration (promotion Guernica)
 1977-1981 : sub-prefect of Ussel (one of the arrondissements of Corrèze department) in  Ussel City. 
 1985-1987 : directeur général of the services of the general council of Corrèze.
 1987-1989 : prefect of Corrèze in Tulle City.
 1989-1993 : prefect of Orne in Alençon City.
 1993-1998 : prefect of Allier in Moulins City.
 1998-2001 : prefect of Vendée in La Roche-sur-Yon City.
 2001-2004 : prefect of Haut-Rhin in Colmar City.

In 2006 he became (ordonnance souveraine of 5 April 2006 of prince Albert II of Monaco) a minister of the principality of Monaco, with the title of conseiller de gouvernement pour l’Intérieur i.e. counsellor for internal affairs, member of the Council of Government and chief of the Military of Monaco.

References
  « Masseron, Paul », in Nouveau dictionnaire de biographie alsacienne
  Notice « Masseron, Paul, Marie » (préfet, né en 1950) page 1495 in  Who’s Who in France : Dictionnaire biographique de personnalités françaises vivant en France et à l’étranger, et de personnalités étrangères résidant en France, 44e édition pour 2013 éditée en 2012, 2371 p., 31 cm,  . 
  http://www.whoswho.fr/bio/paul-masseron_2593 : Who’s Who in France on line (fee))
  http://www.lepetitjournal.com/monaco/actu-monaco/5388-communiqu-paul-masseron-a-pris-ses-fonctions-en-principaut.html . Retrieved 21 May 2013.
  http://www.gouv.mc/Gouvernement-et-Institutions/Le-Gouvernement/Departement-de-l-Interieur . Retrieved 21 May 2013.
  http://www.gouv.mc/Gouvernement-et-Institutions/Le-Gouvernement/Departement-de-l-Interieur/Le-Conseiller-de-Gouvernement-pour-l-Interieur . Retrieved 21 May 2013.
  http://www.nicematin.com/article/derniere-minute-monaco/paul-masseron-le-monsieur-securite-du-mariage-princier.528593.html, site of Nice-Matin, Cédric Verany, « Paul Masseron, le monsieur sécurité du mariage princier », mercredi 18 mai 2011. Retrieved 21 May 2013.
  http://www.lefigaro.fr/actualite-france/2011/06/29/01016-20110629ARTFIG00722-monaco-la-rumeur-circulait-des-dimanche.php : site of le Figaro, Jean-Marc Leclerc, « Monaco : des imprudences de la police ont nourri la rumeur », 30 juin 2011. Retrieved 21 May 2013.

See also 
 Arrondissement of Ussel
 Council of Government
 Military of Monaco

Notes

Living people
1950 births
People from Landerneau
Sciences Po alumni
École nationale d'administration alumni
Prefects of France
Prefects of Corrèze
Prefects of Orne
Prefects of Allier
Prefects of Vendée
Prefects of Haut-Rhin
Monegasque politicians
Ministers of Internal Affairs by country
Officiers of the Légion d'honneur
Officers of the Ordre national du Mérite